Methaneselenol is the organoselenium compound with the formula CH3SeH.  It is the simplest selenol. A colorless gas, it is notorious for its foul odor.

It is prepared by reaction of methyl lithium or a methyl Grignard reagent with selenium followed by protonation of the product  The compound is a metabolite.

According to IR spectroscopy, νSe-H = 2342 cm−1.  For the other homologues, νE-H = 1995  (E = Te), 2606 (E = S), and 3710 cm−1 (E = O) for  methanetellurol, methanethiol, and methanol.

References

Selenols
Hydrides
Organic compounds with 1 carbon atom